Stephen Daniel Mason (born July 8, 1975) is an American musician best known as the lead guitarist for Christian alternative folk rock group Jars of Clay.

Biography 
Mason was born in Joliet, Illinois in 1975, however was brought up from age 8 in Decatur, Illinois where he attended Warrensburg-Latham schools.

Mason joined Jars of Clay as a founding member in 1993 with singer Dan Haseltine and pianist Charlie Lowell while studying at Greenville College in his home state of Illinois. As a submission piece to get into college, Mason wrote an instrumental guitar piece entitled "Frail" which was later recorded and used as the namesake for the group's first demo Frail. The song later had lyrics added by Jars of Clay's lead singer Dan Haseltine for the group's second album Much Afraid.

Growing up in Illinois, Mason is a Chicago Bears football team supporter, but also now supports the Tennessee Titans, who play in his adopted city of Nashville.

He is also a supporter of the Nashville SC soccer club, where he attended its first MLS home match dressed as Moses, resulting in national attention and the club referring to him as "Soccer Moses".

In 2014, Stephen qualified as a Master Barber and has started cutting hair at his shop, The Handsomizer.

Personal life 
Mason married former BBC Radio producer Jude Adam on October 24, 2009.

Guitars, amps, and pedals 
Mason uses a range of different guitars for performing with Jars of Clay, both electric and acoustic. Some of them he uses exclusively in the studio and others exclusively for live performances.
"Grand Auditorium" Taylor twelve string guitar
Gibson "Tal Farlow" series
Baby Taylor guitar
Martin Backpacker travel guitar
Gibson "Chet Atkins" series
Fender Telecaster
Gibson Les Paul
Matchless Chief Guitar Amp
Vox AC-30

As for pedals, over the years Mason has been seen using a Boss Tuner, Visual Sound Jekyll & Hyde, Swell Pedals G-TOD, Tonephile Puredrive, Electro-Harmonix Deluxe Memory Man, DMB Pedals, and a Pedaltrain pedalboard.

References 

American rock guitarists
American male guitarists
Living people
1975 births
Jars of Clay members
American performers of Christian music
Christian music songwriters
Musicians from Joliet, Illinois
Musicians from Decatur, Illinois
Guitarists from Illinois